Sir Charles Brandon (by 1521–1551), was an English politician.

He was a Member (MP) of the Parliament of England for Westmorland in 1547. He was an illegitimate son of Charles Brandon, 1st Duke of Suffolk.

References

1551 deaths
English MPs 1547–1552
Year of birth uncertain